Nama (in older sources also called Namaqua) are an African ethnic group of South Africa, Namibia and Botswana. They traditionally speak the Nama language of the Khoe-Kwadi language family, although many Nama also speak Afrikaans. The Nama People (or Nama-Khoe people) are the largest group of the Khoikhoi people, most of whom have disappeared as a group, except for the Namas. Many of the Nama clans live in Central Namibia and the other smaller groups live in Namaqualand, which today straddles the Namibian border with South Africa.

History

For thousands of years, the Khoisan peoples of South Africa and southern Namibia maintained a nomadic life, the Khoikhoi as pastoralists and the San people as hunter-gatherers. The Nama are a Khoikhoi group. The Nama originally lived around the Orange River in southern Namibia and northern South Africa. The early colonialists referred to them as Hottentots. Their alternative historical name, "Namaqua", stems from the addition of the Khoekhoe language suffix "-qua/kwa", meaning "place of" (found in the names of other Southern African nations like the Griqua), to the language name.

Nama People partial ancestry from Khoikhoi People at the Cape Colony (South Africa) 
In April 1652, Jan van Riebeeck, an official of the Dutch East India Company, arrived at the Cape of Good Hope with 90 people to start initial Dutch settlement at the request of the company. They found the indigenous settlers called the Khoikhoi there, who had settled in the Cape region at least a thousand years before the Dutch arrived.

The Khoikhoi at the Cape practiced pastoral farming; they were the first pastoralists in Southern Africa. They lived beside the San people, who were hunter-gathers. The Khoikhoi had a lot of Nguni cattle and small livestock which they grazed around the Cape. The region was well suited to their lives as pastoralists because it provided enough water for them and their livestock.  

Initially, when the Dutch made a stop at the Cape on the way to the Indonesian archipelago, they were concerned with getting fresh produce and water for their people. Indonesia was rich in crops and spices which could not be produced in Europe, which is why the Dutch had major interest there. The Dutch had enslaved a large number of Indonesians to work on their plantations. In the Cape, Van Riebeek initially attempted to get cattle, land, and labour from the Khoikhoi people through negotiation, but when these negotiations failed, conflicts began to occur. The Dutch settlers waged wars against the Khoikoi, and seized their lands to construct farms for wheat and other produce, and forced many Khoikoi people to work as labourers. Their livestock was also taken and they were denied access to grazing and water resources unless they worked for the Dutch settlers.

During the 18th and 19th centuries, as conflicts intensified and Dutch settlement was expanding and taking up much space in the colony, the expansion of the colony frontier pushed the Khoikhoi Eastwards into the Easternmost Cape & the eventual "closed frontier" native reserves (Transkei &Ciskei) and Northwards across the so-called "open frontier" (Northern Cape & South West Africa/Namibia). Some descendants of Khoikhoi communities, including the Nama, fled north of the colony and crossed the Orange River into German South West Africa (present day Namibia).   

In 1991, a part of Namaqualand (home of the Nama and one of the last true wilderness areas of South Africa) was named the Richtersveld National Park. In December 2002, ancestral lands, including the park, were returned to community ownership and the governments of South Africa and Namibia began creating a trans-frontier park from the west coast of southern Africa to the desert interior, absorbing the Richtersveld National Park.  Today, the Richtersveld National Park is one of the few places where the original Nama traditions survive. There, the Nama move with the seasons and speak their language. The traditional Nama dwelling – the |haru oms, or portable rush-mat covered domed hut – protects against the blistering sun, and is easy to move when grazing becomes scarce.

Nama People at German South West Africa Colony (Namibia) 
Some Khoikhoi groups including the Nama under the leadership of David Witbooi (Hendrik Witbooi's grandfather) had crossed the Orange River into South West Africa. David Witbooi was the first Khoikhoi leader to establish a permanent Namaqua settlement north Orange River beginning in the mid 1840s. In 1863, he eventually led his people to Gibeon (south-central Namibia) where he developed a communialist society centered on cattle, trade and Christianity. After his death in 1875 Moses Witbooi (Hendrik Witbooi's father) assumed chieftaincy and remained in that position until 1883. Like his father Moses followed Christian practices and worked closely with Johannes Olpp, a Protestant missionary affiliated with Rheinische Missionsgesellschaft (Rhenish Mission Society, RMG) who arrived in Gibeon in 1868. Moses supported Olpp's efforts to build a church and mission station, and also helped found an RMG school in the settlement.

Conflicts between Nama people and Herero people 
In June 1884 Hendrik Witbooi had taken over leadership from his father, and in that year he began the first of his several treks with his people north into central Damaraland in search of new settlement. He had just resigned from his position in church as an elder a year before (1883), he styled himself as a biblical prophet and gained support of the most prominent families in Gibeon. Witbooi established a settlement in Hoornkrans the very same year he moved from Gibeon. Hoornkrans was an important stronghold territory controlled by the Herero, powerful Bantu pastoralists community led by Chief Maharero. Witbooi's decision to expand his influence into Hoornkrans sparked a protracted military conflict between the two tribes. However, a few months before the conflict began, Maharero had finalized a protection agreement with officials from the newly arrived German colonial administration. Although he knew about Maharero's treaty with Germany, Witbooi never waivered in his decision to confront the Herero people. Witbooi was campaigning for his tribe's supremacy in the colony and he continued to clash with other tribal communities that were under the auspices of the German protection. These rivalries between the Nama people and other tribes posed a significant problem for the imperial government because the Germans'  mandate for the colony was gradually being weakened. German leaders therefore sought to bring immediate end to the conflicts between Herero people and Witbooi Namaqua.

Nama-German Conflicts 
In June 1886, Reichskomissar Göring wrote Witbooi, encouraging him to end his hostile actions in the colony. He pleaded with the Nama Chief to return home to Gibeon to be with his father and tribe and live in peace there; he warned that the German government could not allow chieftains who have placed themselves under German protection to support his ambition of driving a protected chiefdom into war. Witbooi and his people ignored this warning and continued his campaign for dominance against the Herero. Later that same year Louis Nels, a deputy officer to Göering wrote to Witbooi inviting him to participate in a conciliatory meeting between the various warring communities in Walvis Bay. With this meeting German authorities had hoped to facilitate a peace treaty, however the Namaqua chief did not comply with the request but instead he wrote a letter in response telling Nels that he will not listen to him. He made it known to Nels that he (Witbooi) is a chief of his tribe who is free and an autonomous man who answers only to God. The German officials did not respond to Witbooi's diplomatic reproach. With the limits of German on full display, imperial officials were at a loss about how to end the violence in GSWA.

In June 1888, Göring wrote Chancellor Otto Von Bismarck and described the overall situation as "not very encouraging". April 1889 Göring went so far as to threaten open war against Witbooi and his tribe if he did not halt his attacks against groups allied with Germany. Witbooi's resistance prompted policy makers to seek immediate solutions to the instability in GSWA. The Namaqua resistance provoked the German authorities to act decisively, after 1889 Germany's military presence in the colony began to grow exponentially. In March 1893 Chancellor Von Caprivi proclaimed GSWA a German settlement colony. November same year Emperor Kaiser Wilhelm ɪɪ appointed Curt von François as Landeshauptmann. A fanatic, François looked at Witbooi with disdain and called him a mere "tribesman" whom he could defeat easily. He had a notion that his predecessors acted weakly in dealing with the Nama chief and they made too many concessions. François strongly believed that nothing but relentless severity would end Witbooi's resistance decisively. Initially the German official tried to entice with an annual payment of five thousand marks if he would submit, however the Nama chief maintained his stand.

François was pressured by the Colonial Society to take action against Witbooi, subsequently on April 12 1893 he launched a surprise attack on Witbooi and his tribe at Hoornkrans. 214 soldiers had been sent with an ultimate objective to "destroy the Witbooi Nama tribe". Though Witbooi and majority of his male soldiers escaped the encirclement, German troops killed nearly one hundred Namaqua women and children in their sleep. The Namaqua were unprepared for the raid believing François was still committed to neutrality. Previously Hendrik had scrupulously avoided harming Germans, but now was compelled to join the colonizers in war. In a series of running skirmishes that lasted for more than a year the Namaqua had great success, stealing horses and livestock from the German headquarters in Windhoek. At the end of 1893 Theodor Leutwein replaced Von François, he was appointed to the colony to investigate the reasons for continuing failure to subdue the Nama people . In July 1894 Leutwein asked for 250 troops, with the enlarged army he was able to defeat the Nama people who at the time had run out of ammunition; the English at the Cape and Walvis Bay had refused them assistance. Leiutwein successfully subdued the Nama and forced Hendrik to sign a protection treaty .

Nama-Herero Genocide 1904-1908 

June 1904 Kaiser Wilhelm replaced Leutwein with Lieutenant General Lothar von Trotha; like his predecessor, von Trotha believed that violence would ultimately put an end to the wars in the colony. He employed a policy of extermination of the whole African tribes in the colony.

The Nama people are fighters in pre-colonial times, the Namas and the Herero people fought for control of pastures in central Namibia.  The battle continued for a long part of the 19th century.

From 1904 to 1908, the German Empire, which had colonized present-day Namibia, waged a war against the Nama and the Herero (a group of Bantu pastoralists), leading to the Herero and Namaqua genocide and a large loss of life for both the Nama and Herero populations. This was motivated by the German desire to establish a prosperous colony which required displacing the indigenous people from their agricultural land. Large herds of cattle were confiscated and Nama and Herero people were driven into the desert and in some cases interned in concentration camps on the coast, for example at Shark Island.  Additionally, the Nama and Herero were forced into slave labor to build railways and to dig for diamonds during the diamond rush.

In the 1920s diamonds were discovered at the mouth of the Orange River, and prospectors began moving there, establishing towns at Alexander Bay and Port Nolloth. This accelerated the appropriation of traditional lands that had begun early in the colonial period. Under apartheid, remaining pastoralists were encouraged to abandon their traditional lifestyle in favour of village life.

At the dawn of the 19th century, Oorlam people encroached into Namaqualand and Damaraland. They likewise descended from indigenous Khoikhoi but were a group with mixed ancestry including Europeans and slaves from Madagascar, India, and Indonesia. After two centuries of assimilation into the Nama culture, many Oorlams today regard Khoikhoigowab (Damara/Nama) as their mother tongue, though others speak Afrikaans. The distinction between Namas and Oorlams has gradually disappeared over time to an extent where they are today regarded as one ethnic group, despite their different ancestries.

Clans
 ǀKhowesen (Direct descendants of Captain Hendrik Witbooi) who was killed in the battle with Germans on 29 October 1905. The |Khowesin, reside in modern-day Gibeon under the leadership of Ismael Hendrik Witbooi the 9th Gaob (meaning captain) of the |Khowesen Gibeon, situated 72 km south of Mariental and 176 km north of Keetmanshoop just off the B1, was originally known by the name Khaxa-tsûs. It received its name from Kido Witbooi first Kaptein of the ǀKhowesin.
 Khaiǁkhaun (Red Nation) at Hoachanas, the main group and the oldest Nama clan in Namibia
 ǃGamiǂnun (Bondelswarts) at Warmbad
 ǂAonin (Topnaars) at Utuseb and Rooibank 
 ǃKharakhoen (Fransman Nama) at Gochas. After being defeated by Imperial Germany Schutztruppe in the Battle of Swartfontein on 15 January 1905, this Nama group split into two. Part of the ǃKharakhoen fled to Lokgwabe, Botswana, and stayed there permanently, the part that remained on South West African soil relocated their tribal centre to Amper-Bo. In 2016 David Hanse was inaugurated as chief of the clan.
 ǁHawoben (Veldschoendragers) at Koës
 !Aman at Bethanie which was led by Cornelius Frederick
 ǁOgain (Groot Doden) at Schlip
 ǁKhauǀgoan (Swartbooi Nama) at Rehoboth, later at Salem, Ameib, and Franzfontein
 The Kharoǃoan (Keetmanshoop Nama) under the leadership of Hendrik Tseib split from the Red Nation in February 1850 and settled at Keetmanshoop.

Culture

In general the Nama practice a policy of communal land ownership. Music, poetry and story telling are very important in Nama culture and many stories have been passed down orally through the generations.

The Nama have a culture that is rich in the musical and literary abilities of its people. Traditional music, folk tales, proverbs, and praise poetry have been handed down for generations and form the base for much of their culture. They are known for crafts which include leatherwork, skin karosses and mats, musical instruments (such as reed flutes), jewellery, clay pots, and tortoiseshell powder containers.

Many of the Nama people in South Namibia have lost their lands during German colonialism. New Namibian minister of land reform, Uutoni Nujoma has been accused of preferring other Namibians from other regions over native Namas.

Dress
The traditional dress of Nama women consists of long, formal dresses that resemble Victorian traditional fashion. The long, flowing dresses were developed from the style of the missionaries in the 1800s, and this traditional clothing is today an integral part of the Nama nation's culture.

Habitation
The Nama people's hut or also called matjieshuis is a round hut traditionally made of beautifully designed reed mats on a skeleton of sticks.  It corresponds to their nomadic life of the past, matjieshuis is still part of the life of the inhabitants of Richtersveld: a region made up of mountainous deserts in the north-west of South Africa.  In fact, this is the last place where we can still find them in significant numbers.In the villages currently in the Richtersveld, the matjieshuise are used as a depot to store, as a kitchen, as an additional place to sleep, or even to provide  to tourists like accommodation.
These huts, called haru oms in the Nama language, are made of reed mats woven neatly into a beehive shape.  It is a dwelling house for all seasons: it is cool and well ventilated in summer, it is naturally insulated by reed carpets in winter, and protected from the rain by the porous stems which swell with water.  All materials are organic and not over-harvested, this is a home that truly respects the environment.  Women and men take part in the making: in the collection of materials, in the preparation of the rugs and in the assembly of the hut, in a meticulous and meticulous process which has remained a true Nama art.

Settlements 
Traditionally, Nama camps had 5-30 huts. These huts were circular domes and their doors faced the center of camp. They were also arranged hierarchically, the chief was placed west and faced east. Other families were placed based on their seniority, Elder brothers and their families were on the far right, while younger brothers and their families on the left. There are no enclosures for adult livestock. They are expected to sleep in front of their owners huts. Calves and lambs are placed in an enclosed area in the middle of camp. The huts were lined with reed mats made by women. The mats are placed on wooden frames. The reeds are able to soak and absorb water well, thus being able to protect the Nama people from summer rains. These Huts are very mobile, but also stable, being able to break them down in less than an hour. The huts are also reusable.

Religion
They have largely abandoned their traditional religion through the sustained efforts of Christian (and now Muslim) proselytisers. The majority of the Nama people in Namibia today are therefore Christian while Nama Muslims make up a large percentage of Namibia's Muslims.

Burials 
In the past funerals were not a big social gathering. The Nama people simply buried the body and never spoke about the person again due to fear of spirits. Today funerals are social solidarity. The position of the person in the community being buried matters that determines the burial site. Members of close relatives of the deceased 
person spend a week preparing the grave site, digging, and using flattened oil drums as sheets. The actual mourning takes place three days before the actual burial. During the first two night of the mourning, there is singing of hymns, preaching, and praying. On the last day of the mourning and the day of the burial, there are speeches presented and messages of condolences.  The grave site itself is lined with brick and once the body is inside a wooden board is laid upon the top before it is covered with dirt. This style of the burial site makes it easy for preservation of the body.

Wedding ritual

Namas have a complicated wedding ritual. First the man has to discuss his intentions with his family. If they agree they will advise him of the customs to ask the bride's family and then accompany him to the place she lives. The yard at the bride's living place is prepared prior to the future husband's family's arrival, animal hides are laid out in the corners for the different groups to sit down and discuss.

The groom's family ask for the gate to be opened. If this is granted, the groom is interrogated about details of the bride, including the circumstances of their first meeting and how to identify her body marks to make sure both know each other well. If the bride is pregnant or already has children from her future husband or someone else, the bride is subjected to the "door cleansing" ceremony (slaughtering and consuming a snow-white goat). After several days the wedding ritual continues in reverse; the bride's family visits the clan of the groom. If all is to the satisfaction of the two clans, an engagement day is announced.

At the engagement, the groom's family brings live animals to the woman's family home. The animals are slaughtered, hung on three sticks, and each part is offered to the bride's family. Other items like bags of sugar or flour are only offered in quantities of two or four to indicate that there will always be abundance of food. This process is also celebrated in reverse at the man's family home. White flags are mounted on both families' houses which may not be taken off but wither or are blown off by the wind one day.

The wedding preparations can take up to one year. The family of the groom makes a gift to the bride's mother, traditionally a cow and a calf, for she has raised the bride at her breast. A bargaining process accompanies the gift that can take weeks in itself. On wedding day, both families provide animals and other food and bring it to the bride's home. The wedding itself takes place in a church. Festivities afterward go on for several days. The first night after the wedding the couple spends separately. On the next morning, they set off for their own home.

See also
Democratic Action for Namas

References

Literature

 Schultze, Leonhard (1907) Aus Namaland und Kalahari, Gustav Fischer Verlag, Jena  
 Leonhard Schultze et al. (1970) In Namaland and the Kalahari, Human Relations Area Files, New Haven, Conn.

External links

South African National Parks website

 
Ethnic groups in South Africa
Ethnic groups in Namibia
Ethnic groups in Botswana
African nomads